Naval Support Activity Bethesda — NSA Bethesda, NSAB, or simply Bethesda — is a military base of the United States Navy located in Bethesda, Maryland.  NSA Bethesda is responsible for base operational support for its major tenant, the Walter Reed National Military Medical Center.

Other organizations hosted by NSA Bethesda include:

 Armed Forces Radiobiology Research Institute
 National Intrepid Center of Excellence
 Uniformed Services University of the Health Sciences
 five Fisher Houses

References

External links
 Official website

Naval Support Activities of the United States Navy
Bethesda, Maryland